Eddie Kaye Thomas (born October 31, 1980) is an American actor who rose to prominence as Paul Finch in the American Pie film series. His other notable appearances include Andy Rosenberg in the Harold & Kumar series, Jeff Woodcock in 'Til Death, genius behaviorist Dr. Tobias "Toby" M. Curtis in CBS show Scorpion, and as series regular Mike Platt in American sitcom Off Centre on The WB.

Early life
Thomas was born on Staten Island, New York, to a Jewish family. He grew up opposite a train station in the neighborhood of New Dorp. He adopted the name Eddie Kaye Thomas as a stage name for his acting career; his legal name is not publicly known.

Career
Thomas began his acting career as a stage actor at age seven, appearing in Four Baboons Adoring the Sun in 1992, and The Diary of Anne Frank, opposite Natalie Portman in 1997. He graduated from New York's Professional Children's High School already a veteran of the Broadway stage.

Thomas made his onscreen debut in an episode of the ABC Soap Opera One Life to Live, and later starred in an episode of Are You Afraid of the Dark? about a possessed camera that destroys everything it shoots, entitled The Tale of the Curious Camera. He also appeared on Law & Order twice in 1996, playing different characters each time. On the Thanksgiving 1998 edition of Late Night with Conan O’Brien Thomas played Ricky, Conan and Andy's son home from college for the holidays.

His screen work includes the independent movie called Illtown, The Rage: Carrie 2, and James Toback's controversial motion picture Black and White in which Thomas co-starred with Robert Downey, Jr. and Jared Leto. Thomas also played the title role in Canadian shock-comic Tom Green's Freddy Got Fingered, and the stereotypical Jewish character Rosenberg in Harold & Kumar Go to White Castle (2004) and Harold & Kumar Escape from Guantanamo Bay (2008) opposite David Krumholtz.

From 2001 to 2002, Thomas starred in the television series Off Centre with John Cho. He returned to the small screen in the sitcom 'Til Death for the first two seasons (2006 and 2007). His character was removed from the show for budget reasons but still appeared in season 3. Due to the writers' strike a few season 2 episodes were shown starting Wednesday, October 8, 2008. He has also appeared in the CSI: Crime Scene Investigation episode "No More Bets".

Thomas appeared in commercials for Blockbuster Video, Snickers and Nike. He also appeared in 311's music video for "Flowing".

He has continued to do stage work, appearing off Broadway in 2006, and has voiced Barry Robinson on American Dad! since 2005.

From 2010 to 2011, he appeared as David Kaplan in HBO comedy-drama television series How to Make It in America.

In 2014, he appeared as Mark in DirecTV's First Original Comedy Things You Shouldn't Say Past Midnight.
In the same year, Thomas was a member of the principal cast of the TV series Scorpion on CBS as Harvard trained psychiatrist and genius behaviourist, Dr. Tobias M Curtis. The series was cancelled after completing four seasons (93 episodes) in May 2018. In 2018, he joined the cast of thriller film Shattered Memories, also known by the name Last Night.

In 2020, he reunited with his American Pie costars Alyson Hannigan and Jason Biggs in the Fox sitcom Outmatched.

Filmography

Film

Television

Music videos

Awards and nominations

References

External links
 
 

1980 births
Male actors from New York City
American male child actors
American male film actors
American male stage actors
American male television actors
American male voice actors
Jewish American male actors
Living people
People from New Dorp, Staten Island
20th-century American male actors
21st-century American male actors
21st-century American Jews